Douglas Ottley (1923-1983) was an association football player who represented New Zealand at international level.

Ottley made his full All Whites debut in a 0–7 loss to Australia on 28 August 1948  and ended his international playing career with six A-international caps to his credit, his final cap an appearance in a 9–0 win over New Hebrides on 9 April 1951.

References 

1983 deaths
New Zealand association footballers
New Zealand international footballers
1923 births
Association footballers not categorized by position